The 2008 Korean League Cup, also known as the 2008 Samsung Hauzen Cup, was the 21st competition of the Korean League Cup.

Group stage

Group A

Group B

Knockout stage

Top scorers

Awards

Source:

See also
2008 in South Korean football
2008 K League
2008 Korean FA Cup

References

External links
Official website 
Review at K League 

2008
2008
2008 domestic association football cups
2008 in South Korean football